Robert Buchholz is an American voice actor, writer, story editor, and voice director. He has provided voices for anime and video games. He is the owner of Spliced Bread Productions.

Filmography

Anime
 Akira - Ryu (Animaze dub)
 A Whisker Away - Kusugi-sensei
 Battle Athletes Victory - Alfred Gurtlent
 Beastars - Oguma (Netflix dub)
 The Big O - Beck Gold/Jason Beck
 Cowboy Bebop - Tom Wiles
 Digimon: Digital Monsters - Additional Voices (Adventure and Adventure 02)
 Digimon: The Movie - Andy, Uncle Al, Additional Voices
 Duel Masters - Additional Voices
 Fushigi Yûgi - Tokaki (Young)
 Ghost in the Shell: SAC 2045 - Paz
 Ghost in the Shell: Stand Alone Complex - Pazu
 If I See You in My Dreams - Director Hamaoka
 Kashimashi: Girl Meets Girl - Sora Hitoshi
 Mazinkaiser SKL - Koujidani
 Metal Fighter Miku - Tokichiro Harajuku
 Mobile Suit Gundam 08th MS Team - Pilot (Episode 9)
 Mouse - Heitarou Onizuka
 Nodame Cantabile - Hajime Tanioka, Tatsuo Noda
 Outlaw Star - Gene Starwind
 Trigun - Steve
 Wolf's Rain - Hubb Lebowski
 Zenki - Zenki (Big)

Non-anime
 El Chavo (English version) - Professor Jirafales
 The Happy Cricket (English version) - Barnaby
 Bird Island - Tin

Video games
 Atlantica Online - Various NPCs
 Ghost in the Shell: Stand Alone Complex - Pazu

Production Work

Voice Direction
 Ah My Buddha
 Ajin
 B-Daman Crossfire
 Baten Kaitos Origins
 Crisis Core: Final Fantasy VII 
 Culdcept Saga 
 Cyborg 009 VS Devilman
 Devilman Crybaby
 Digimon Adventure
 Digimon Adventure 02
 Dirge of Cerberus -Final Fantasy VII-
 Dissidia: Final Fantasy
 Dissidia 012 Final Fantasy 
 Duel Masters (Season 1.5)
 Final Fantasy VII Advent Children 
 Great Teacher Onizuka
 Hot Shots Golf: Open Tee
 Kingdom Hearts II
 Kingdom Hearts Re:Chain of Memories
 Kingdom Hearts Coded
 Kingdom Hearts 358/2 Days
 Kingdom Hearts Birth by Sleep
 Kingdom Hearts 3D: Dream Drop Distance
 Knights of Sidonia
 Kuromukuro
 Marseille
 Nodame Cantabile
 Pokémon Origins
 The 3rd Birthday
 The World Ends with You 
 Violetta
 Viewtiful Joe
 Wakfu (Season 3)
 Yukikaze

Script Writer
 Bobobo-bo Bo-bobo
 Digimon Adventure
 Digimon Adventure 02
 Dual! Parallel Trouble Adventures
 Duel Masters
 Great Teacher Onizuka
 Mad Movies with the L.A. Connection
 Rave Master
 Vampire Princess Miyu
 Yukikaze

Casting Direction
 Final Fantasy VII: Advent Children (additional casting and voice recording)

See also
List of voice actors

External links

Living people
American voice directors
American casting directors
American male voice actors
American television writers
American male screenwriters
American male television writers
Year of birth missing (living people)